Rodolfo Bergamo (born 23 August 1955 in Venezia) is a retired Italian high jumper.

Biography
He finished sixth at the 1976 Olympic Games, this was, until Gianmarco Tamberi gold medal at the 2020 Olympic Games, the best performance for an Italian high jumper at the Summer Olympics like Giacomo Crosa, now journalist, at 1968 Summer Olympics.

His personal best jump is 2.24 metres, achieved in July 1978 in Rome.

National records
 High jump: 2.22 m ( Milan, 8 June 1976)
 High jump: 2.24 m ( Rome, 25 July 1978)

Achievements

National titles
Rodolfo Bergamo has won 3 times the individual national championship.
Italian Athletics Championships
High jump: 1977, 1978

See also
 Men's high jump Italian record progression

References

External links
 

1955 births
Living people
Italian male high jumpers
Athletes (track and field) at the 1976 Summer Olympics
Olympic athletes of Italy
Sportspeople from Venice
Athletics competitors of Centro Sportivo Carabinieri